Fruit Growers Express (FGE) was a railroad refrigerator car leasing company that began as a produce-hauling subsidiary of Armour and Company's private refrigerator car line. Armour controlled both the packing operations and the transport insulated railroad car line, and its customers had complained they were overcharged. In 1919 the Federal Trade Commission ordered the company's spinoff of Fruit Growers Express for antitrust reasons, which was accomplished by 1920.

Fruit Growers Express received ownership of 4,280 railroad cars, rolling stock repair operations in Alexandria, Virginia and Jacksonville, Florida, and a number of ice houses and railcar servicing facilities on the east coast of the United States, which is served. Fruit Growers Express was owned by a consortium of major railroads, in which the Chicago and Eastern Illinois, Norfolk & Western, and the New York, New Haven and Hartford Railroad (known simply as the New Haven) were major stockholders.  The Richmond, Fredericksburg & Potomac Railroad also owned a small amount of shares (4.5%), but sold them all by 1982. Other railroads with an interest in FGE were the Atlantic Coast Line, Baltimore & Ohio, Pennsylvania Railroad, Chesapeake & Ohio and the Southern Railway. Hauling produce and servicing it along the route of railroad lines was a very specialized and exacting business segment. Having Fruit Growers Express as a nominally independent company, owned by a consortium of railroads and focused on specific operation and construction of iced and insulated boxcars, freed the major railroads from each bearing the heavy capital costs associated with refrigerated produce operations and the seasonal surges that accompanied it.

In order to compete with the Pacific Fruit Express and Santa Fe Refrigerator Despatch and to bring southeastern produce to the western markets, FGE and the Great Northern Railway formed the Western Fruit Express (WFE) on July 18, 1923, a move that added 3,000 cars to the equipment pool. By 1926, FGE had expanded its service into the Pacific Northwest and the Midwest through the WFE and the Burlington Refrigerator Express (BREX), its other partly owned subsidiary (formed in partnership with the Chicago, Burlington and Quincy Railroad (CB&Q) on May 1). That same year, FGE purchased 2,676  reefers from the Pennsylvania Railroad.

In addition to refrigerated railcar leasing and servicing, FGE also built its own freight cars. In February 1928 FGE formed the National Car Company, a railcar manufacturing unit as a subsidiary to its refrigerated food transport business. Customers included Kahns, Oscar Mayer, and Rath Packing. FGE became a major producer of railroad freight cars, mostly insulated or refrigerated boxcars, although they eventually built other railcars as well. FGE's main railcar production, in keeping with its focus, was refrigerated cars, originally ice-cooled boxcars and insulated (but not cooled) boxcars, and then mechanical refrigerated cars, or "reefers", as technology developed. FGE insulated boxcars, built with wood rather than steel for its better insulating qualities, became popular in the 1960s and 1970s. FGE insulated boxcars were used to transport items that needed protection from heat or freezing but not necessarily separate cooling such as that provided by refrigerated railcars. FGE built railcars and then leased them to the group of railroads that owned FGE. Fruit Growers Express also produced and maintained its own fleet of railcars for independent leasing. In the 1970s, when trucking started to bite into the market of insulated boxcars moving produce, FGE branched into other types of railcar production, notably the production of bay window cabooses and intermodal equipment for FGE's own use and that of its parent railroads. By the mid-1980s, when safety laws were relaxed and automated technology introduced, the caboose ultimately became obsolete, eliminating this production segment for FGE. With increased competition from trucks hauling produce on highways and the consolidation of the railroad industry in the 1980s spurred by the Staggers Rail Act in 1980, Fruit Growers Express, as a consortium, found that its markets shrank. With the mergers that formed Norfolk Southern in 1982 and CSX in 1986 and both companies subsequent acquisitions, a duopoly of major railroads with vast resources and routes was effectively created on the east coast and midwest, eroding further need for FGE as an independent entity.  The company is now a paper entity controlled by the CSX Corporation, the successor railroad to the majority of Fruit Growers Express final ownership.

Fruit Growers Express was headquartered in Washington, DC, with major railcar shops in Alexandria, Virginia, Jacksonville, Florida and Indiana Harbor, Indiana. At its peak, the Alexandria FGE facility, originally located at the Richmond, Fredericksburg & Potomac Railroad's busy Potomac Yards but in 1925 relocated to nearby Cameron Yards, the Southern Railway's switching yard in Alexandria. At its peak, FGE's Alexandria facility could produce 1,000 railcars per year. The Alexandria railcar facility had stopped building freight cars and cabooses by 1981, and the maintenance facility was closed down in 1994. The structure there now serves as the headquarters for Alexandria's DASH bus service.

Notes

References

External links
 The Florida Railroad Company Inc. / The Fruit Growers Express Company  Short History of Fruit Growers Express
 Fruit Growers Express Company #35832 — photos and short history of an example of the wooden ice-type "reefers" commonly placed in service between 1920 and 1940.
 Fruit Growers Express Company #56415 — photos and short history of an example of the wooden ice-type "reefers" used in the first half of the 20th century for shipping produce.

Refrigerator car lines of the United States
CSX Transportation
Fruit production
American companies established in 1920
Food and drink companies established in 1920
Transport companies established in 1920
1920 establishments in Florida